Mason Valley may mean:

 Mason Valley (California), a valley in San Diego County, California
 Mason Valley (Nevada), a valley in western Nevada  
 Mason's Valley, Arizona, an earlier name for Top-of-the-World, Arizona